SuperProfs is an education technology startup founded in 2010 and based out of Bengaluru, India. It provides exam preparation classes.

History 
SuperProfs was founded by Piyush Agrawal, a Stanford University PhD dropout, in 2010 to provide competitive exam preparation for Indian students. SuperProfs' achievements has in part been the result of a Mobile app that works at slower speeds of internet connection by allowing students to download lectures.

Funding 
SuperProfs has raised three million dollars from venture capital firms Kalaari Capital  and IDG Ventures India in 2014.

References

External links 
 Official website
 Mobile app

Indian companies established in 2010
Educational technology companies of India